

Incumbents
 President – Mahinda Rajapaksa
 Prime Minister – D. M. Jayaratne
 Chief Justice – Asoka de Silva
 Speaker of the Parliament of Sri Lanka – W. J. M. Lokubandara until 8 April, Chamal Rajapaksa from 22 April

Provincial Governors
 Central Province – Tikiri Kobbekaduwa
 Eastern Province – Mohan Wijewickrama
 North Central Province – Karunarathne Diulgane
 Northern Province – G.A. Chandrasiri
 North Western Province – Tissa Balalla
 Sabaragamuwa Province – Janaka Priyantha Bandara until April, Wijesinghe Lokubandara from April
 Southern Province – Kumari Balasuriya
 Uva Province – Nanda Mathew
 Western Province – Alavi Moulana

Chief Ministers
 Central Province – Sarath Ekanayake
 Eastern Province – S. Chandrakanthan
 North Central Province – Berty Premalal Dissanayake
 Northern Province – Vacant
 North Western Province – Athula Wijesinghe
 Sabaragamuwa Province – Maheepala Herath
 Southern Province – Shan Wijayalal De Silva
 Uva Province – Shashindra Rajapaksa
 Western Province – Prasanna Ranatunge

Events

January
 9 January - The Sri Lankan army releases over 700 former Tamil Tiger fighters after a rehabilitation program.
 12 January - Sri Lankan President Mahinda Rajapaksa announces that Tamils will be given greater say in matters of governance, proposing power sharing agreements.
 22 January - The home of an opposition activist is bombed in the Sri Lankan capital Colombo days ahead of the presidential election.
 24 January - Sri Lankan opposition candidate General Sarath Fonseka receives the support of former President Chandrika Kumaratunga in the 2010 presidential election.
 26 January - Voters in Sri Lanka go to the polls in a presidential election.
 27 January - Incumbent President of Sri Lanka Mahinda Rajapaksa is declared the winner of Sunday's presidential election, defeating opposition candidate Sarath Fonseka.

February
 February 4 - Sri Lankan Independence

March

April
 14 April - Sinhala and Tamil new year

May
 27 May - Buddha's Birthday
 9 May - Vesak
 31 May -Navi Pillay, United Nations High Commissioner for Human Rights, at the opening of the fourteenth regular session of the Human Rights Council call Sri Lanka Government  to establishing an independent international accountability mechanism to address the serious concerns which had arisen in the last stages of the fighting in 2009

June

July

August
 Esala Perahera

September

October

November
 2010 Colombo floods

December

Sport

Cricket

Rugby

Soccer

Deaths

January
1
Periyasamy Chandrasekaran, 52, Sri Lankan politician, Member of Parliament, after short illness.

February
4
H. A. Perera, 59, Sri Lankan actor, after short illness.

July
29
C. I. Gunesekera, 90, Sri Lankan cricketer.

August
30
Lakshman Jayakody, 80, Sri Lankan politician, Minister of Buddhist Affairs (1994–2000), after short illness.

References

 
Years of the 21st century in Sri Lanka
Sri Lanka